Lonely Man may refer to:

 "Lonely Man" (Elvis Presley song), a 1960 song by Elvis Presley
 "Lonely Man", a song by Status Quo from the 1974 album Quo
 "Lonely Man" (Splinter song), a song by Splinter
 "Lonely Man", a song by Audio Adrenaline from the 2001 album Lift
 The Lonely Man, a 1957 American film
 A Lonely Man, a 1972 album by The Chi-Lites
 "The Lonely Man Theme", an instrumental song from the 1978 TV series The Incredible Hulk